A list of Bangladeshi films released in 1971.

Releases

See also

 1971 in Bangladesh
 List of Bangladeshi films
 Cinema of Bangladesh
 Dhallywood

References

External links 
 Bangladeshi films on Internet Movie Database

Film
Bangladesh
Lists of Pakistani Bengali films by year
 1971